Photoacoustics could refer to:

Photoacoustic spectroscopy 
Multispectral optoacoustic tomography
Photoacoustic imaging